Albert Maximo Cristina (born 18 November 1970 in Curaçao, Dutch Antilles) is a volleyball player from the Netherlands, who represented his native country at two consecutive Summer Olympics, starting in 2000. After having finished in fifth place in Sydney, Australia he ended up in ninth place with the Dutch Men's National Team four years later in Athens, Greece.

References
  Dutch Olympic Committee
 

1970 births
Living people
Dutch men's volleyball players
Dutch people of Curaçao descent
Volleyball players at the 2000 Summer Olympics
Volleyball players at the 2004 Summer Olympics
Olympic volleyball players of the Netherlands
Curaçao men's volleyball players